The Ottoman–Portuguese or Turco-Portuguese confrontations<ref>Mohammed Hasen al- Aidarous, The Ottoman-portuguese conflict in the Arabian Gulf  during the second half of the 16th century.</ref>Salih Özbaran, The Ottoman response to European expansion: studies on Ottoman-Portuguese relations in the Indian Ocean and Ottoman administration in the Arab lands during the sixteenth century, Isis Press, 1994, viii refers to a series of different military encounters between the Portuguese Empire and the Ottoman Empire, or between other European powers and the Ottoman Empire in which relevant Portuguese military forces participated. Some of these conflicts were brief, while others lasted for many years. Most of these conflicts took place in the Indian Ocean, in the process of the expansion of the Portuguese Empire, but also in the Red Sea. These conflicts also involved regional powers, after 1538 the Adal Sultanate, with the aid of the Ottoman Empire, fought against the Ethiopian Empire, which was supported by the Portuguese, under the command of Cristóvão da Gama, the son of the famous explorer Vasco da Gama. This war is known as the Ethiopian–Adal war.

Conflicts
The different conflicts were the following:
Portuguese expedition to Otranto (1481)
Siege of Jeddah
Expedition to Kamaran
Siege of Diu (1531)
Conquest of Tunis (1535)
Ottoman–Portuguese conflicts (1538–1560)
Ottoman–Portuguese conflicts (1586–1589)
Sack of Madeira
Ottoman–Venetian War (1714–1718)

Notes

References
Attila & Balázs Weiszhár, Háborúk lexikona, Atheneaum, Budapest, 2004 (in Hungarian; title means in English Lexicon of Wars'')

Wars involving Portugal
Wars involving the Ottoman Empire